Binny and Co is a shipping, textile, banking and insurance firm based in  the city of Chennai, India. It is one of the oldest business firms in Chennai city.

History 

Binny and Co was founded in Madras by John Binny as a general, clearing and forwarding agency in 1797. Initially, the company functioned from a building then known as Amir Bagh on Mount Road, where the headquarters of the Indian Overseas Bank is now located. The company, then moved to a house a few blocks away, where Hotel Taj Connemara is now situated. The firm moved to its present headquarters in Armenian Street in 1812. With the passage of time, Binny and Co entered the banking and insurance sectors.

John Binny set up a partnership with one Mr Denison and  renamed the company as Binny and Denison in 1800. Binny and Co were the landing agents for the British India Steam Navigation Company and had a fleet of 35 barges and 30 lighters to transport men and goods from ships to land. They also ran a motor bus service for land transportation. Binny and Co was one of the founding members of the Madras Chamber of Commerce and Industry.

Binny and Co set-up the Buckingham Mills in 1876 followed by the Carnatic Mills in 1881. Both were merged to form the Buckingham and Carnatic Mills in 1920. The Bangalore Cotton, Silk and Woolen Mills was set-up in Bangalore in 1884. The Buckingham and Carnatic Mills was the most long-lasting among the company's ventures.

Decline 

Binny and Co suffered heavily from the crash of the bank Arbuthnot & Co on 22 October 1906. India's independence on 15 August 1947 further crippled the fortunes of the company. The Buckingham and Carnatic Mills, the company's only venture that was still successful, began to decline by the 1970s. The mills closed down their operations in 1996 and the mills were sold out in 2001.

Notes

References

See also 

 EID Parry
 Arbuthnot & Co

Banks established in 1797
Financial services companies established in 1797
Companies based in Chennai
Defunct textile companies of India
Textile industry in Tamil Nadu
Indian companies established in 1797